Ryan Ford may refer to:

Ryan Ford (fighter) (born 1982), Canadian professional boxer
Ryan Ford (footballer) (born 1978), English footballer